Dionysius "Dion" Sebwe (born March 7, 1969 in Monrovia) is a retired Liberian football defender.  He has served as the Deputy Minister for Operations in the Liberian Ministry of Defense.

Sebwe attended Park College where he played soccer.  In March 1995, the Kansas City Wiz selected Sebwe in the 1996 MLS College Draft.  On April 17, 1996, the Wiz released Sebwe.

Sebwe served in the U.S. Army and is a former member of the Liberia national football team. His brother is Kelvin Sebwe.

References

External links 

Dionysius Sebwe interview

1972 births
Living people
Liberian footballers
Liberian expatriate footballers
Association football defenders
Sportspeople from Monrovia
2002 African Cup of Nations players
FC Utrecht players
SC Heerenveen players
Orlando Sundogs players
Sporting Kansas City players
Minnesota Thunder players
Eredivisie players
Expatriate footballers in the Netherlands
Expatriate soccer players in the United States
A-League (1995–2004) players
Sporting Kansas City draft picks
Liberia international footballers